Margerison is a surname. Notable people with the surname include:

Lee Margerison (born 1973), English footballer
Tom Margerison (1923–2014), British science journalist, writer and broadcaster